Mary Dolores Cullen (born 1929), was the first woman to become a member of the academic staff at Maynooth University and an Irish women's movement activist. She was the co-founder of the Women's History Association of Ireland.

Biography
Cullen was born in Dublin in 1929. She got her education in Tramore, County Waterford and Cork city before going on to complete a masters in history in University College Dublin in 1952. Cullen became a tutor in St Catharine's College, Cambridge from 1956 to 1958 and returned to her alma mater from 1964 to 1967. She went from UCD to Maynooth University lecturing there until 1994. She was also a part time lecturer in Trinity College Dublin from 1992.

Cullen married and had children in the 1960s which was when Cullen discovered second wave feminism and became a notable part of the Irish women's movement. She ensured women's history became accessible to the public. She has been influential in promoting feminism and women's history to more than three decades of students. She founded, with Margaret MacCurtain, and was the original president of the Women's history association of Ireland. Cullen was awarded an honorary Doctorate by the National University of Ireland in 2011.

Annually The MacCurtain/Cullen Prize in Irishwomen’s History is awarded in recognition of the outstanding contribution to Irish women’s history.

Bibliography
 Female Activists: Irish Women and Change 1900-1960 
 Telling It Our Way: Essays in Gender History 
 Exploration of the Responses of a Social Services Department to the Needs of Black Disabled Elders - SCA (Education) & University of Warwick Monograph S. 
 Girls Don't Do Honours: Irish Women in Education in the 19th and 20th Centuries 
 Women, Power and Consciousness: Women in 19th Century Ireland 
 Female Activists: Irish Women and Change, 1900-1960
 ShoeShine Kids
 Women, Power and Consciousness in 19th Century Ireland: Eight Biographical Studies

Sources

1929 births

Possibly living people
Alumni of University College Dublin

Maynooth University
Trinity College Dublin-related lists
Irish feminists